Amund Maarud (born 7 April 1981 in Nes, Akershus, Norway) is a Norwegian blues/rock musician (guitar, vocals) and composer, known as a solo artist and as frontman of rock bands The Grand (2005-2010) and the duo «Morudes» (2010 -) with his brother, the drummer Henrik Maarud.

Career 
Maarud is known to many as one of the best blues guitarists in Norway. He has toured domestically and internationally with various bands, to the delight of their audiences and the press. The concerts are invariably described as potent live show which combines various elements from blues to psychedelic rock.

Together with his brother Henrik Maarud (drums), he started the band «MaarudKara» at the age of six. The band came second in the Talentiaden (1997) on NRK, and released the album First Blues the year after. In 2000 he started his solo career backed by his band A. M. Band, still with his brother drummer and with blues in their repertoire. The band released two albums Ripped, Stripped & Southern Fried (2003) and Commotion (2004), and was nominated for the Spellemannprisen 2003 in the class Blues/country for the debut album Ripped, Stripped & Southern Fried. In 2006 he initiated the bandet The Grand, with the same lineup as A. M. Band, but had a more rocky and psychedelic expression. The band released the album The Grand (2007). The band is currently on rest for an indefinite period of time.

Together with his drummer brother, he started the duo «Morudes» in 2010, and started around the turn of 2010/2011 a new solo project under his own name. Solo project has a musical idiom that is closer to traditional guitar blues. With him on stage are his drummer brother, Simen Aanerud (piano), and Bendik Brænne (baryton saxophone). He thus figures in two bands with many similarities in origin, but who will part in their musical expression. For the solo album Electric he was awarded Spellemannprisen 2011 in the class Blues.

Maarud debuted as an actor in the film Kommandør Treholt og Ninjatroppen that premiered in August 2010. He is co-owner of Snaxville Studio.

Discography

Solo albums 
2011: Electric (Snaxville Recordings/Musikkoperatørene)
2012: Dirt (Snaxville Recordings/Musikkoperatørene)
2015: Volt (Snaxville Recordings/Musikkoperatørene)

Collaborative works 
Within «MaarudKara»
1999: First Blues (Tylden)

With «Amund Maarud Band»
2003: Ripped, Stripped & Southernfried (Blue Mood/BMG)
2004: Commotion (BMG)

Within  The Grand
2007: The Grand (The Grand Recordings/Sonet)

Lineups in bands or backing bands

Members of «Amund Maarud Band» (2000-2005)
 Amund Maarud - guitar & vocals
 Henrik Maarud - drums
 Jan Eirik Hallingskog - bass (2000-2002)
 Arne F. Rasmussen - harmonica (2000-2002)
 Bill Troiani - bass guitar (-2003)
 Håkon Høye - guitar (2003-2004)
 Per Tobro - bass (2004–)
 Eirik Tovsrud Knutsen - keyboards (2004–)

Members of «The Grand» (2005-2010)
 Amund Maarud - guitar & vocals
 Henrik Maarud - drums
 Per Tobro - bass
 Eirik Tovsrud  Knudsen - Hammond B3 organ

Members of «Morudes» (2010-) 
 Amund Maarud - guitar & vocals
 Henrik Maarud - drums & vocals

Backingband Amund Maarud (2010-)
 Amund Maarud - guitar & vocals
 Henrik Maarud - drums & vocals
 Egil Stemkens - bass
 Simen Aanerud - piano
 Bendik Brænne - baryton saxophone

References

External links 

 
 Biography on NRK Artists

1981 births
Living people
Norwegian rock singers
Norwegian male guitarists
Norwegian rock guitarists
Norwegian composers
Norwegian male composers
Norwegian blues singers
Norwegian blues guitarists
Spellemannprisen winners
Musicians from Nes, Akershus
21st-century Norwegian singers
21st-century Norwegian guitarists
21st-century Norwegian male singers